Vulnerable is the sixth album by English trip hop artist Tricky released in 2003 on the Epitaph record label.

Album production
The main female collaborator on this album was the Italian singer Costanza Francavilla, a previous fan who approached Tricky at one of his shows and gave him a CD with songs. "On the 17th of December 2001, Tricky, one of Costanza's favourite artists ever, came to play in Rome," Costanza's Official site reads. "Costanza managed to give Tricky's drummer a demo CD (with 3 songs written, performed and produced by her). The day after Tricky called her asking to work with her the collaboration started."

In Spring 2002 she moved to Los Angeles to begin recording Vulnerable. During the summer 2002 her song "My Head" was part of Tricky's Blowback limited re-edition. In summer 2003,  Costanza performed live on Tricky's "13" tour all around Europe (including the Glastonbury Festival and the London Meltdown Festival). In fall 2003 the Back to Mine compilation dedicated to Tricky came out featuring Costanza's song "Desire" (written, performed and produced by Costanza).

Track listing
 "Stay"
 "Antimatter"
 "Ice Pick"
 "Car Crash"
 "Dear God" (XTC cover)
 "How High"
 "What Is Wrong"
 "Hollow"
 "Moody"
 "Wait for God"
 "Where I'm From"
 "The Lovecats" (The Cure cover)
 "Search, Search, Survive"

Limited edition DVD
 Vulnerable movie
 "Antimatter" (Jimmy & T Remix)
 "Receive Us" (Radagon & Tricky)
 "You Don't Wanna" (live in Rome)
 Photo gallery

Charts

References

2003 albums
Tricky (musician) albums
Epitaph Records albums